Cercocarpus breviflorus, commonly known as desert mountain mahogany or hairy mountain mahogany, is a species of plant in the  rose family, native to northern Mexico and the southwestern United States.

Description
They are fasciculate, with groups of two to four leaves forming small tufts separated by lengths of bare twig. The yellowish-green tubed flowers are inconspicuous and grow from the axils of the leaves. The fruits are achenes with twisted, hairy, elongated and persistent styles, looking like long narrow feathers.

Distribution and habitat
Hairy mountain mahogany occurs in mountainous parts of the southwestern United States (Texas, New Mexico, Arizona) and northern Mexico (from Sonora to Tamaulipas, south as far as Querétaro), on both limestone and igneous rock.

Ecology
Hairy mountain mahogany grows at moderately high elevations, often in the company of pinyon pine (Pinus edulis), alligator juniper (Juniperus deppeana), one-seed juniper (Juniperus monosperma), cliff fendlerbush (Fendlera rupicola), antelope bitterbrush (Purshia tridentata), wavyleaf oak (Quercus x undulata), and skunkbush sumac (Rhus trilobata). The branches are often heavily encrusted with lichens.

References

breviflorus
Flora of Mexico
Flora of the Southwestern United States
Plants described in 1853